Diplotaxodon is a small genus of seven formally described, as well as a number of undescribed, deep-water species of cichlid fish endemic to Lake Malawi in east Africa. These fishes represent a remarkable adaptive radiation of offshore and deep-water adapted fish descended from ancestral shallow water forms. They include the dominant zooplankton-feeding fish of the offshore and deep-water regions of the lake, as well as a number of larger species that appear to feed on small pelagic fishes. Adult sizes range from 10 to 30 cm in total length, depending on species.

Reproductive biology 

Females and immature fish are silvery, like typical pelagic fish, but mature males develop stronger breeding colours, typically contrasting patterns of black, white and yellow. Females of several species have been found carrying eggs and young in their mouths and it is likely that all species are maternal mouthbrooders, like all other known haplochromine cichlids. Males in breeding dress with ripe gonads are often collected together in large numbers, along with a few ripe and mouthbrooding females, suggesting that these fishes gather together to breed in particular areas. Most species seem to breed between February and August. Females lay very few eggs- ranging on average from 16 to 40 in species examined. However, the eggs are very large - around 5-7mm in diameter. In common with other offshore-living cichlid fishes, these have evolved to have fewer, but larger offspring, perhaps to increase their chances of surviving predation and starvation in the open water habitats. Unlike some other offshore cichlid fish, none of the Diplotaxodon species are known to use inshore nursery areas for their young, and their entire life-cycle seems to be completed in the open waters of the lake.

Evolution and population genetics 

Molecular genetic studies suggest that Diplotaxodon species are all closely related and are ancestral to the more benthic-feeding Pallidochromis tokolosh, which together comprise a monophyletic group or clade which has evolved within Lake Malawi. Population genetic studies indicate that similar-looking forms with different male breeding colours represent distinct species. In marked contrast to the better known rocky shore 'mbuna' cichlids which are split into many geographically isolated populations on particular islands or rocky coastal regions, molecular studies indicate that there are few barriers to the movement and interbreeding of Diplotaxodon populations within the lake. This lack of geographic barriers in the present lake has made scientists consider that their species might have diverged either by the controversial mechanism of sympatric speciation. Alternatively, they may have diverged into new species when major droughts led to Lake Malawi partially drying up and forming 2 or more much smaller lakes.

Human exploitation 

Diplotaxodon species are important food fish around the lake, being collected by a number of small-scale fishing methods, such as Chirimila seines and baited hooks, as well as by trawling. Although they represent a potentially very large fishery stock (100,000 tonnes), with a potentially sustainable fishery yield of around 20,000 tonnes, their populations are spread thinly in inaccessible deep-water and offshore habitats, making them difficult to exploit economically, although some seasonal fisheries seem to exploit them heavily on traditional breeding grounds. A single species (D. limnothrissa) has occasionally been collected and bred as an aquarium fish.

Species
As of 2021, there are 8 species of Diplotaxodon discovered with the most recent named as Diplotaxodon dentatus. During its discovery it was first inspected as Diplotaxodon argentus because the teeth on oral jaws were fully exposed with closed mouth. It was then later separated from Diplotaxodon argentus and named as Diplotaxodon dentatus because of the differences of its snout length.

 Diplotaxodon aeneus G. F. Turner & Stauffer, 1998
 Diplotaxodon altus Stauffer, Phiri & Konings, 2018
 Diplotaxodon apogon G. F. Turner & Stauffer, 1998
 Diplotaxodon argenteus Trewavas, 1935
 Diplotaxodon ecclesi W. E. Burgess & H. R. Axelrod, 1973
 Diplotaxodon greenwoodi Stauffer & McKaye, 1986
 Diplotaxodon limnothrissa G. F. Turner, 1994
 Diplotaxodon longimaxilla Stauffer, Phiri & Konings, 2018
 Diplotaxodon macrops G. F. Turner & Stauffer, 1998
 Diplotaxodon  dentatus

References

 Trewavas, E.  (1935)  A synopsis of the cichlid fishes of Lake Nyasa.  Annals and Magazine of Natural History (10) 16: 65-118. Available from www.malawicichlids.com
 Fryer, G. & Iles, T.D. (1972)  The cichlid fishes of the Great Lakes of Africa.  Oliver & Boyd, Edinburgh; TFH Publications, Neptune City, New Jersey; 641 pp.
 Burgess, W.E., & Axelrod, H.R. (1973)  New cichlids from Lake Malawi. Tropical Fish Hobbyist 22 (2), October: 14, 87-93, 95-98.
 Stauffer, J.R. Jr., & McKaye, K.R. (1986).  Description of a paedophagous deep-water cichlid (Teleostei: Cichlidae) from Lake Malawi, Africa. Proceedings of the Biological Society of Washington 99: 29-33.
 Eccles, D.H., & Trewavas, E. (1989).  Malawian cichlid fishes. The classification of some Haplochromine genera.  Lake Fish Movies, Herten, Germany, 335 pp.
 Turner, G.F.  (1994) A description of a commercially important new pelagic species of the genus Diplotaxodon (Pisces: Cichlidae) from Lake Malawi, Africa. J. Fish Biology 44, 799-807.
 Turner, G.F. (1995) Management, conservation and species changes of exploited fish stocks in Lake Malawi, In: T.J. Pitcher & P.J.B. Hart, eds. The Impact of Species Changes in African Lakes. London, Chapman & Hall, pp. 365–395.
 Thompson, A.B., Allison, E.H. & Ngatunga, B.P. (1996).  Distribution and breeding biology of offshore cichlids in Lake Malawi/Niassa. Environmental Biology of Fishes 47, 235-254.
 Allison, E.H., K. Irvine, K Thompson, A.B. & Ngatunga, B.P. (1996) Diets and food consumption rates of pelagic fish in Lake Malawi, Africa. Freshwater Biology 35, 489-515.
 Turner, G.F. (1996) Offshore Cichlids of Lake Malawi. Cichlid Press, Germany. 240pp.
 Turner, G.F. & Stauffer, J.R. (1998) A description of three deep water cichlids of the genus Diplotaxodon (Teleostei: Cichlidae) from Lake Malawi, Africa, with a redescription of Diplotaxodon ecclesi Burgess & Axelrod. Ichthyological Explorations of Freshwaters 8, 239-252.
 Shaw, P.W. Turner, G.F., Idid, M.R., Robinson, R.L. & Carvalho, G.R. (2000). Genetic population structure indicates sympatric speciation of Lake Malawi pelagic cichlids. Proceedings of the Royal Society of London B 267, 2273-2280.
 Duponchelle, F. & Ribbink, A.J. (eds.).  (2000).  Fish Ecology Report. Lake Malawi/Nyasa/Niassa Biodiversity Conservation Project.  SADC/GEF (Southern African Development Community, Gaborone, Botswana / Global Environmental Facility, Washington, D.C.). Available from www.malawicichlids.com
 Turner, G.F., Robinson, R.L., Ngatunga, B.J., Shaw, P.W. & Carvalho, G.R. (2001) Pelagic cichlid fishes of Lake Malawi/Nyasa. In: Coleman, R.M. Cichlid Research State of the Art. Journal of Aquariology & Aquatic Sciences 9, 287-302.
 Turner, G.F., Robinson, R.L., Ngatunga, B.P., Shaw, P.W. & Carvalho, G.R. (2002) Pelagic cichlid fishes of Lake Malawi/Nyasa: biology, management and conservation. In: Cowx, I. Management and Ecology of Lake and Reservoir Fisheries. Blackwell (Fishing News Books). pp. 353–367.
 Turner, G.F., Robinson, R.L., Shaw, P.W. & Carvalho, G.R. (2004) Identification and biology of Diplotaxodon, Rhamphochromis and Pallidochromis. In: Snoeks, J. (ed). The cichlid diversity of Lake Malawi/Nyasa: identification, distribution and taxonomy. Cichlid Press, El Paso, Texas.
 Kanyerere, G.Z., A.J. Booth, A.J. & Weyl, O.L.F (2005)  Management advice for the Diplotaxodon limnothrissa (Teleostei: Cichlidae) resource in the south-east arm of Lake Malawi, based on per-recruit analysis. African Journal of Aquatic Science 30, 141-145.
 Sugawara, T., Terai, Y., Imai, H., Turner, G.F., Koblmüller, S., Sturmbauer, C., Shichida, Y. & Okada, N. (2005) Parallelism of amino acid changes at the RH1 locus affecting spectral sensitivity among deep-water cichlids from Lakes Tanganyika and Malawi. Proceedings of the National Academy of Sciences, USA 102, 5448-5453.
 Kanyerere, G.Z., Weyl, O.L.F. & Booth, A.J. (2005)  Growth, reproduction and population structure of Diplotaxodon limnothrissa in the southeast arm of Lake Malawi.  African Journal of Aquatic Science 30, 37-44.
 Duponchelle, F., Ribbink A.J. Msukwa, A. Mafuka, J. Mandere, D. & Bootsma, H.. (2005)  Food partitioning within the species-rich benthic fish community of Lake Malawi, East Africa.  Canadian Journal of Fisheries and Aquatic Sciences  62, 1651-1664.
 Genner, M.J., Nichols, P., Carvalho, G.R., Robinson, R.L., Shaw, P.W. & Turner, G.F. (2007) Reproductive isolation among deep water cichlid fishes of Lake Malawi differing in monochromatic male breeding dress. Molecular Ecology 16, 651-662.
 Konings A (2007) Malawi Cichlids in their Natural Habitat, 4th Edn. Cichlids Press, El Paso, USA. (and earlier editions)
 Genner, M.J., Nichols, P., Shaw, P.W., Carvalho, G.R., Robinson, R.L. & Turner, G.F. (2008) Genetic homogeneity among breeding grounds and nursery areas of an exploited Lake Malawi cichlid fish. Freshwater Biology 53, 1823-1831.
 Duponchelle, F, Paradis, E., Ribbink, A.J. & Turner G.F. (2008) Parallel life history evolution in mouthbrooding cichlids from the African Great Lake. Proceedings of the National Academy of Sciences, USA 105, 15475-15480
 Darwall WRT, Allison, EH, Turner GF, Irvine K (2010) Lake of flies, or lake of fish? A trophic model of Lake Malawi. Ecological Modelling 221, 713-727.
 Genner, M.J., Nichols, P., Shaw, P.W., Carvalho, G.R., Robinson, R.L. & Turner, G.F. (2010) Population structure on breeding grounds of Lake Malawi's ‘twilight zone’ cichlid fishes. Journal of Biogeography 37, 258-269
 http://www.malawicichlids.com

 
Haplochromini

Cichlid genera
Taxa named by Ethelwynn Trewavas